SCAN Health Plan (SCAN) is a not-for-profit, Medicare Advantage based in Long Beach, California. Founded in 1977, SCAN provides healthcare coverage to Medicare beneficiaries in California, Arizona, and Nevada, currently serving nearly 270,000 members. It is one of the largest not-for-profit Medicare Advantage plans in the country. SCAN Health Plan is part of SCAN Group, a mission-driven organization that is tackling some of the biggest issues in health-care for older adults.

Early history 
SCAN helped implement a huge shift in healthcare in the late 1970s when a group of senior activists joined city officials in an effort to make healthcare services more accessible, more connected and more affordable for Long Beach's growing number of older residents. This group included 12 seniors who represented the most active and prominent organizations for older adults in the city, as well as representatives from the Long Beach Department of Senior Citizen Affairs. Together, with assistance from the University of Southern California (USC), they created a blueprint for a new and improved healthcare system. This system brought all the city's diverse social service agencies and medical providers into an integrated, community-based organization, providing greater access to affordable support and services for the elderly.

The Senior Care Action Network, or SCAN, was created based on the proposal developed by the team at USC. (The new network was briefly known as the Long Beach Geriatric Healthcare Council, Inc., before changing its name to SCAN.) Their healthcare delivery model was centered on assessing each senior's needs on an individual level in order to coordinate appropriately for each unique case, providing specific social services and medical care through a network of local agencies, community providers and hospitals.

Multipurpose Senior Services Program 
In 1979, the state of California selected SCAN as one of eight sites for the state's Multipurpose Senior Services Program (MSSP). This program exists to help elderly Medi-Cal recipients in the Long Beach area stay out of nursing institutions as long as possible by providing home-based services to deliver the care they need. For the last 40 years, SCAN has served California's most at-risk seniors as one of the state's 62 MSSP sites through Independence at Home, a community service of SCAN.

Social HMO 
Until 1983, SCAN had been relatively unknown outside of Long Beach. That changed when it was awarded a contract from the federal government as one of four sites nationwide to pilot the Social Health Maintenance Organization (SHMO) demonstration program. The SHMO concept expanded what SCAN was already doing (offering home-based services so seniors could avoid or delay nursing home placement) to also include the at-risk elderly enrolled in Medicare and provide healthcare coverage to other Medicare beneficiaries.

In November 1984, under a three-and-a-half-year contract with the federal government, SCAN was officially licensed as a health plan in California. In March 1985, it began enrolling members in its Social HMO. Congress renewed the SHMO demonstration project five times before the program was ended in 2004.

Growth and expansion 
Between 1996 and 1998, SCAN more than doubled its membership by expanding into three Southern California counties (Orange, Riverside and San Bernardino).

When the government ended the SHMO program, SCAN continued to operate as a Medicare Advantage plan, offering Medicare beneficiaries healthcare coverage and services beyond what the federal program alone would cover. SCAN continued to grow, extending its service area and membership as it expanded in both Southern and Northern California.

In 2021 SCAN grew by more than 60,000 members, in large part due to the popularity of its Embrace Venture plan, a product that offered a Medicare Part B premium give-back.  The give-back was offered during a period of heightened inflation in order to ease the economic burden seniors. 

SCAN's grown during this period was also fueled by its expansion into three Arizona counties (Maricopa, Pima and Pinal) and Clark County, Nevada, marking the first time SCAN expanded its reach beyond California into two states simultaneously.

Quality of care 
In 2021, SCAN Health Plan received an overall rating of 4.5 out of 5.* for the fifth year in a row the only Medicare Advantage plan in California to do so. This 5-star Quality Rating is given by the Centers for Medicaid and Medicare Services (CMS) and is based on SCAN's offered plans (except SCAN Healthy at Home, an HMO Special Needs Plan; and VillageHealth, an HMO-POS Special Needs Plan).

*Medicare evaluates plans based on a 5-star rating system. Star ratings are calculated each year and may change from one year to the next.

Current coverage by counties
SCAN provides healthcare coverage to more than 270,000 Medicare beneficiaries in 13 counties in Northern California, Southern California, Nevada, and Arizona.

Community benefits 
Independence at Home (IAH), a community service of SCAN Health Plan, provides intensive care management for low-income seniors and builds community capacity to serve older adults.  The services are provided through various county and state contract programs, the largest of which is the Multipurpose Senior Services Program and programs funded by SCAN Health Plan to support its mission of keeping seniors healthy and independent.  IAH also provides a resource and referral line to connect seniors and their caregivers to needed services and support in Los Angeles, Orange, Riverside and San Bernardino counties and a virtual senior center for older adults in all the communities served by SCAN Health Plan.

Diversification 
Beginning in 2020, SCAN began a diversification program through its SCAN Group parent organization aimed at developing to deliver evidence-based, patient-centered care to older adults.  Beginning in 2021, SCAN launched four new companies:

 Healthcare in Action, a medical group that provides care and services to older adults and other vulnerable individuals experiencing homelessness. 
 Welcome Health, a primary care medical group that treats older adults through a combination of virtual and in-home visits. 
 Homebase Medical, a medical practice that provides palliative care, chronic disease management, care transition management, and in-depth personal health assessments to people in their homes.  Homebase Medical, which was launched after SCAN's 2022 acquisition of The Residentialist Group, serves SCAN Health Plan members as well as members of other health plans. 
 myPlace Health, an integrated care delivery organization that will specialize in providing personalized care to older adults who wish to remain living in their homes and communities for as long as possible and which delivers care through the PACE (Program for All-Inclusive Care for the Elderly) model and as a value-based provider working in partnership with local health plans.

References

External links
SCAN Health Plan

Health care companies established in 1977
Companies based in Long Beach, California
1977 establishments in California